Myroconger is the only genus of eels, the thin eels, in the family Myrocongridae. Very little is known about the group.

Until recently, only a single specimen from this family was known. This individual had been caught off Saint Helena in 1868. In the 1990s and 2000s, deep-sea submersibles identified several more individuals, including four further species. The first known species, M. compressus, was bright red in colour, but not all other species share this trait.

Species
The currently recognized species in this genus are:
 Myroconger compressus Günther, 1870 (red eel)
 Myroconger gracilis Castle, 1991
 Myroconger nigrodentatus  Castle & Béarez, 1995 (orange eel)
Myroconger pietschi 
 Myroconger prolixus Castle & Béarez, 1995
 Myroconger seychellensis Karmovskaya, 2006

References

Eels
Taxa named by Albert Günther